Chet L. Grimsley (born July 14, 1956) is notably the first White-American Student Athlete from the C.I.A.A. Grimsley pledged, and subsequently became a member of Groove Phi Groove Social Fellowship from Johnson C. Smith University, a Historically Black University (HBCU). In 1976, Grimsley received the M.V.P. Award and the Pettis Norman Award for football.  Grimsley was also named to the First Team all-CIAA and received Eastern Airlines Most Valuable Player All American. Grimsley was also the president of the Fellowship of Christian Athletes and Athlete of the Month at an HBCU.

Biography

Early life

Chet Grimsley was born on July 14, 1956 Crawford Long Hospital in Atlanta, Georgia. Grimsley follows in his father’s footsteps: Chester Ramon Grimsley was an All-State football player for State Champion Tift County High School and at 6 ft 8 inches and 270 lbs, went on to play for the University of Alabama on a football scholarship. The younger Grimsley was 6 ft 5.5 inches and 275 lbs, and recruited to Johnson C. Smith University by Coach Charlie Cox. He was not uncomfortable attending a Historically Black University because Grimsley grew up in Southwest Atlanta, Georgia where he was the only white student athlete on the Therrell High School Football Team in 1973 in a predominantly Black high school. He also participated in baseball and soccer.

University

Upon arrival at JCSU in 1974, Grimsley was greeted and assisted by Grooves. Coupling this positive experience with being a freshman away from home and meeting other Groove members on the football team, Grimsley was inspired to pledge Groove Phi Groove Social Fellowship, Inc. as a sophomore. Grimsley not only excelled in football, but was a consistent fixture on the Dean's List and popular on campus. Groove Phi Groove SFI is a social fellowship that is common at H.B.C.U.'s around the country. Willie McMahand and Grimsley pledged in the '70s at Johnson C. Smith University. By the way, Grimsley is white and was named to the first team CIAA and MVP award for the Golden Bulls of J.C.S.U. Both remain friends to this day. McMahand's son Wesley was a starting running back at West Point for Stan Brocks Army Black Knights football team.

Sports career

Grimsley had an impressive year in 1976, accumulating several accolades including Eastern Airlines Player of the Year, 1976 All-American, 1976 Mr. Football, All CIAA 1st Team. As a senior in 1977, Grimsley was Athlete of the Month and made the difficult decision not to pursue a professional careers as a football player due to his goals and size. After graduating from JCSU, Grimsley was an assistant coach for JCSU in 1978 after graduation and then again in 1999-2000.  

Grimsley went on to make the practice squad of the Tampa Bay Buccaneers in August 1979. He joined the United States Army in December 1979 and became the first football player to graduate from the U.S. Military Intelligence School. He was also an All-Army wrestling champion. Grimsley served in the Army and Army Reserves until 1986. Additionally, Grimsley was a bodyguard who worked with Diana Ross, Jim & Tammy Faye Bakker and Gary Coleman.A Gentle Giant Helps The Young And Old By Chris Starks The Rockdale Ga Citrzen News October 31, 1997 Grimsley then took a more traditional career approach by becoming a manager for Marshall’s and subsequently, Supervisor Retail Distribution for the same organization.

After Retirement

Chet Big Hog now volunteers at Shriners Hospitals for Children. Chet L Grimsley is a Hall of Fame member and played football with Canadian Football Hall of Fame Grover Covington and worked with Hall of Fame member and wrestler Sylvester Ritter aka WWE Hall of Famestar The Junkyard Dog. Grimsley resides in Blairsville, Georgia a city in North Georgia Union County, Georgia In the United States.

Media

Grimsley's autobiography, "The White Golden Bull," was published by Xulon Press.   His second book published by Too Smart Publishing was "The White Golden Bull: How Faith in God Transcended Racial Barriers", . The book chronicles his experience growing up in Atlanta, Georgia and his journey to play football for Johnson C. Smith University in Charlotte, North Carolina a Historically Black College in the early 1970s.

Chet was aided in his efforts by editors Linda Weaver, a retired Fannin County High School English teacher; Edmond Davis, a professor and author of "The Tuskegee Airmen of Arkansas"; Merle Chapman, who worked for the Pentagon. Donna Grimsley, Chet's ex-wife, was a major contributor to the first book all while being a real estate broker and serving on the board for the local SAFE House. Elizabeth Dyer is an entrepreneur and IT specialist, owning 4BCO.com, S&S Smoothies and Supplements, Shake the Weight, The Nifty Thrifty, and Sensational Shakes.

Chet credits God, teachers, coaches, teammates and Groove Phi Groove SFI and his faith in God for giving him the strength and ability to overcome diversity and challenges. In 1995, Chet was inducted in the Johnson C. Smith University Sports Hall of Fame along with Canadian Football League Hall of Fame Grover Covington. He was recognized as the first Euro-American to garner accoldates as All-CIAA and All-American at JCSU and at HBCU.

Personal

Chet lives in Blairsville, Georgia with his two dogs, Dukes and Daisy. He has served on the board for the Humane Society.

TV

Windstream Communications produced two 30 minute shows called "Common Cup" on Chet's life and book "The White Golden Bull".

References

1956 births
American football quarterbacks
Johnson C. Smith Golden Bulls football players
Living people
Players of American football from Atlanta
People from Blairsville, Georgia